Sebastian Szałachowski (born 21 January 1984 in Lublin) is a Polish player who plays as a striker.

Honours

Club
Legia Warsaw
 Ekstraklasa (1): 2005–06
 Polish Cup (1): 2010–11
 Polish SuperCup (1): 2008

Career

Club
Szałachowski had a good start of the 2006–07 season until he was injured. His injury lasted over a year and he was expected to return for the spring 2007–08 season. His injury lasted until close to the end of the 2007–08 season but didn't show full recovery. However, the start of the 2008–09 season started very well for Szałachowski who found a spot in left midfield where he scored one goal in the league and two goals in the 2008–09 UEFA Cup. But while playing in a league game against Cracovia he broke his leg and again missed half of the season.

On 15 June 2011 Legia announced that the club won't renew Szałachowski's contract.
On 25 July 2011, he joined ŁKS Łódź on a one-year contract

References

External links
 

1984 births
Living people
Sportspeople from Lublin
Polish footballers
Motor Lublin players
Górnik Łęczna players
Legia Warsaw players
ŁKS Łódź players
MKS Cracovia (football) players
Ekstraklasa players
Association football midfielders